The women's 70 kg (154 lbs) Semi-Contact category at the W.A.K.O. World Championships 2007 in Coimbra was the second heaviest of the female Light-Contact tournaments being the equivalent of the heavyweight division when compared to Full-Contact's weight classes. There were eight women from two continents (Europe and North America) taking part in the competition.  Each of the matches was three rounds of two minutes each and were fought under Semi-Contact rules.

The gold medal went to Hungary's Zsofia Minda who defeated German opponent Adriane Doppler in the final on points.  Defeated semi finalists Russia's Liliya Saifullina and Croatian Ana Znaor had to make do with bronze.

Results
These matches were decided on points.

See also
List of WAKO Amateur World Championships
List of WAKO Amateur European Championships
List of female kickboxers

References

External links
 WAKO World Association of Kickboxing Organizations Official Site

Kickboxing events at the WAKO World Championships 2007 Coimbra
2007 in kickboxing
Kickboxing in Portugal